Nicholas Scibetta, also known as "Little Nicky" (died 1978), was a Sicilian American mobster who was the nephew of Joseph and John Zicarelli, the brother-in-law of mobster Sammy Gravano and uncle of Gerard Gravano, who was a Gambino crime family mob associate who was later marked as an informant by fellow crime family members.

Early life
Scibetta was born and raised in Bensonhurst, Brooklyn, like his future brother-in-law Gravano. He was the only son born to first-generation immigrants, his father from Cammarata in the province of Agrigento, Sicily, and his Italian-American mother from Bayonne, New Jersey. Scibetta had two older sisters, Debra and Diane. His mother was a housewife and their father was "a terrific father, but very strict" man who was a certified electrical engineer who worked the night shift for Western Electric (now AT&T Technologies) putting together circuit boards for the telephone company.

In 1971, Gravano married Debra.

Falling out with the Gambino crime family and murder
In 1978, Castellano allegedly ordered the murder of Gambino associate Scibetta. A cocaine and alcohol user, Scibetta participated in several public fights and insulted the daughter of George DeCicco. Since Scibetta was Salvatore "Sammy the Bull" Gravano's brother-in-law, Castellano asked Frank DeCicco to first notify Gravano of the impending hit. When advised of Scibetta's fate, a furious Gravano said he would kill Castellano first. However, Gravano was eventually calmed by DeCicco and accepted Scibetta's death as the punishment earned by his behavior. Another part of the motive for the murder was that Scibetta was suspected of being gay. Gravano later said, "I chose against Nicky. I took an oath that Cosa Nostra came before everything."

Scibetta was dismembered and his body was never found other than an arm.

In popular culture
In the made-for-television HBO movie Gotti, Scibetta is portrayed as "Nicky Scibetta" by actor Frank Crudele. In the film Witness to the Mob, Nicky is portrayed by actor Kirk Acevedo. He is allegedly a real-life inspiration for HBO prison drama series Oz characters father and son Nino Schibetta and Peter Schibetta.

Discrepancies in film
In the television movie Gotti, Sammy Gravano, portrayed by William Forsythe, murders Nicholas by himself in a construction supply warehouse, while in his autobiography Underboss he states that members his own crew, allegedly Liborio Milito, Joseph D'Angelo and Frank DeCicco, carried out the murder contract for Paul Castellano and not Gravano. The Gravano character also states that his wife Debra, the sister of Nicholas, would be divorcing him after he testified in court about being an accomplice in both before and after the fact of Nicholas' gangland execution. Debra did not.

See also
List of solved missing person cases

References

External links
American Mafia

1970s missing person cases
1978 deaths
Formerly missing people
Gambino crime family
Male murder victims
Missing person cases in New York City
Murdered American gangsters of Italian descent
Year of birth missing